Lore Fischer (27 May 1911 – 16 October 1991) was a German alto, a concert singer who recorded Bach cantatas with Fritz Lehmann.

References

Further reading 
 Friedrich Herzfeld: Das Lexikon der Musik, Ullstein, Frankfurt am Main – Berlin – Vienna (1976)
 Karl-Josef Kutsch, Leo Riemens: Großes Sängerlexikon. Elektronische Ausgabe der dritten, erweiterten Auflage, Digitale Bibliothek Band 33, Berlin 2004, Directmedia, page 7645, article „Fischer, Lore“

German contraltos
1911 births
1991 deaths
20th-century German women singers